Xavier 'Xavi' Moré Roca (born 7 June 1982) is a Spanish former professional footballer who played as a right midfielder.

Club career
Born in Barcelona, Catalonia, Moré first played professionally for Real Valladolid (where he was coached by his father José), but managed only seven La Liga appearances from 2002 to 2004. On 19 January 2005, he had arguably his best moment with the Castile and León club, scoring in a 1–1 away draw against Real Madrid in that season's Copa del Rey and being essential as his team progressed to the quarter-finals on the away goals rule.

Moré then signed for CD Castellón, being an undisputed starter for the Segunda División side and also being managed by his father, after which he moved to Pontevedra CF in the Segunda División B. On 4 August 2009, after his contract with the Galicians expired, he joined another club in the third tier, Real Oviedo.

References

External links

1982 births
Living people
Spanish footballers
Footballers from Barcelona
Association football midfielders
La Liga players
Segunda División players
Segunda División B players
Tercera División players
Real Valladolid Promesas players
Real Valladolid players
CD Castellón footballers
Pontevedra CF footballers
Real Oviedo players
Burgos CF footballers